Nazi human experimentation was a series of medical experiments on large numbers of prisoners, including children, by Nazi Germany in its concentration camps in the early to mid 1940s, during World War II and the Holocaust. Chief target populations included Romani, Sinti, ethnic Poles, Soviet POWs, disabled Germans, and Jews from across Europe.

Nazi physicians and their assistants forced prisoners into participating; they did not willingly volunteer and no consent was given for the procedures. Typically, the experiments were conducted without anesthesia and resulted in death, trauma, disfigurement, mutilation, or permanent disability, and as such are considered examples of medical torture.

At Auschwitz and other camps, under the direction of Eduard Wirths, selected inmates were subjected to various experiments that were designed to help German military personnel in combat situations, develop new weapons, aid in the recovery of military personnel who had been injured, and to advance Nazi racial ideology and eugenics, including the twin experiments of Josef Mengele. Aribert Heim conducted similar medical experiments at Mauthausen.

After the war, these crimes were tried at what became known as the Doctors' Trial, and revulsion at the abuses perpetrated led to the development of the Nuremberg Code of medical ethics. The Nazi physicians in the Doctors' Trial argued that military necessity justified their experiments, and compared their victims to collateral damage from Allied bombings.

Experiments
The table of contents of a document from the Subsequent Nuremberg trials prosecution includes titles of the sections that document medical experiments revolving around: food, seawater, epidemic jaundice, sulfanilamide, blood coagulation and phlegmon. According to the indictments at the subsequent Nuremberg Trials, these experiments included the following:

Experiments on twins
Experiments on twin children in concentration camps were created to show the superiority of heredity over the environment in determining phenotypes and to find ways to increase German reproduction rates. The central leader of the experiments was Josef Mengele, who, from 1943 to 1944, performed experiments on nearly 1,500 sets of imprisoned twins at Auschwitz. About 200 people survived these studies. The twins were arranged by age and sex and kept in barracks between experiments, which ranged from amputations, infecting them with various diseases, and injecting dyes into their eyes to change their color. He also attempted to create conjoined twins by sewing twins together, causing gangrene and, eventually, death. Often, one twin would be forced to undergo experimentation, while the other was kept as a control. If one twin died from experimentation, the second twin would be brought in to be killed at the same time. Doctors would then look at the effects of experimentation and compare both bodies. If the first twin survived, Mengele would dissect their bodies.

Bone, muscle, and nerve transplantation experiments

From about September 1942 to about December 1943 experiments were conducted at the Ravensbrück concentration camp, for the benefit of the German Armed Forces, to study bone, muscle, and nerve regeneration, and bone transplantation from one person to another. In these experiments, subjects had their bones, muscles and nerves removed without anesthesia. As a result of these operations, many victims suffered intense agony, mutilation, and permanent disability.

On 12 August 1946, a survivor named Jadwiga Kamińska gave a deposition about her time at Ravensbrück concentration camp, describing how she was operated on twice. Both operations involved one of her legs, and, although she never describes herself as having any knowledge as to what exactly the procedure was, she explained that both times she was in extreme pain and developed a fever post surgery, but was given little to no aftercare. Kamińska describes being told that she had been operated on simply because she was a "young girl and a Polish patriot". She describes how her leg oozed pus for months after the operations.

Prisoners were also experimented on by having their bone marrow injected with bacteria to study the effectiveness of new drugs being developed for use in the battle fields. Those who survived remained permanently disfigured.

Head injury experiments
In mid-1942 in Baranowicze, occupied Poland, experiments were conducted in a small building behind the private home occupied by a known Nazi SD Security Service officer, in which "a young boy of eleven or twelve [was] strapped to a chair so he could not move. Above him was a mechanized hammer that every few seconds came down upon his head." The boy was driven insane from the torture.

Freezing experiments
In 1941, the Luftwaffe conducted experiments with the intent of discovering means to prevent and treat hypothermia. There were 360 to 400 experiments and 280 to 300 victims, indicating that some victims suffered more than one experiment.

Another study placed prisoners naked in the open air for several hours with temperatures as low as −6°C (21°F). Besides studying the physical effects of cold exposure, the experimenters also assessed different methods of rewarming survivors. "One assistant later testified that some victims were thrown into boiling water for rewarming."

Beginning in August 1942, at the Dachau camp, prisoners were forced to sit in tanks of freezing water for up to three hours. After subjects were frozen, they then underwent different methods for rewarming. Many subjects died in this process. In a letter from 10 September 1942, Rascher describes an experiment on intense cooling performed in Dachau where people were dressed in fighter pilot uniforms and submerged in freezing water. Rascher had some of the victims completely underwater and others only submerged up to the head.

The freezing and hypothermia experiments were conducted for the Nazi high command to simulate the conditions the armies suffered on the Eastern Front, as the German forces were ill-prepared for the cold weather they encountered. Many experiments were conducted on captured Soviet troops; the Nazis wondered whether their genetics gave them superior resistance to cold. The principal locales were Dachau and Auschwitz. Sigmund Rascher, an SS doctor based at Dachau, reported directly to Reichsführer-SS Heinrich Himmler and publicised the results of his freezing experiments at the 1942 medical conference entitled "Medical Problems Arising from Sea and Winter". Himmler suggested that the victims could be warmed by forcing them to engage in sexual contact with other victims. An example included how a hypothermic victim was placed between two naked Romani women. Approximately 100 people are reported to have died as a result of these experiments.

Malaria experiments
From about February 1942 to about April 1945, experiments were conducted at the Dachau concentration camp in order to investigate immunization for treatment of malaria. Healthy inmates were infected by mosquitoes or by injections of extracts of the mucous glands of female mosquitoes. After contracting the disease, the subjects were treated with various drugs to test their relative efficacy. Over 1,200 people were used in these experiments and more than half died as a result. Other test subjects were left with permanent disabilities.

Immunization experiments
At the German concentration camps of Sachsenhausen, Dachau, Natzweiler, Buchenwald, and Neuengamme, scientists tested immunization compounds and serums for the prevention and treatment of contagious diseases, including malaria, typhus, tuberculosis, typhoid fever, yellow fever, and infectious hepatitis.

Viral hepatitis 
From June 1943 until January 1945 at the concentration camps, Sachsenhausen and Natzweiler, experimentation with 'epidemic jaundice' was conducted. The test subjects were injected with the disease in order to discover new inoculations for the condition. These tests were conducted for the benefit of the German Armed Forces. Most died in the experiments, whilst others survived, experiencing great pain and suffering.

Mustard gas experiments
At various times between September 1939 and April 1945, many experiments were conducted at Sachsenhausen, Natzweiler, and other camps to investigate the most effective treatment of wounds caused by mustard gas. Test subjects were deliberately exposed to mustard gas and other vesicants (e.g. Lewisite), which inflicted severe chemical burns. The victims' wounds were then tested to find the most effective treatment for the mustard gas burns.

Sulfonamide experiments
From about July 1942 to about September 1943, experiments to investigate the effectiveness of sulfonamide, a synthetic antimicrobial agent, were conducted at Ravensbrück. Wounds inflicted on the subjects were infected with bacteria such as Streptococcus, Clostridium perfringens (a major causative agent in gas gangrene) and Clostridium tetani, the causative agent in tetanus. Circulation of blood was interrupted by tying off blood vessels at both ends of the wound to create a condition similar to that of a battlefield wound. Researchers also aggravated the subjects' infection by forcing wood shavings and ground glass into their wounds. The infection was treated with sulfonamide and other drugs to determine their effectiveness.

Sea water experiments
From about July 1944 to about September 1944, experiments were conducted at the Dachau concentration camp to study various methods of making sea water drinkable. These victims were subject to deprivation of all food and only given the filtered sea water. At one point, a group of roughly 90 Roma were deprived of food and given nothing but sea water to drink by Hans Eppinger, leaving them gravely injured. They were so dehydrated that others observed them licking freshly mopped floors in an attempt to get drinkable water.

A Holocaust survivor named Joseph Tschofenig wrote a statement on these seawater experiments at Dachau. Tschofenig explained how while working at the medical experimentation stations he gained insight into some of the experiments that were performed on prisoners, namely those in which they were forced to drink salt water. Tschofenig also described how victims of the experiments had trouble eating and would desperately seek out any source of water, including old floor rags. Tschofenig was responsible for using the X-ray machine in the infirmary and describes how, even though he had insight into what was going on, he was powerless to stop it. He gives the example of a patient in the infirmary who was sent to the gas chambers by Sigmund Rascher simply because he witnessed one of the low-pressure experiments.

Sterilization and fertility experiments
The Law for the Prevention of Genetically Defective Progeny, which was passed on 14 July 1933, legalized the involuntary sterilization of persons with diseases claimed to be hereditary: weak-mindedness, schizophrenia, alcohol abuse, insanity, blindness, deafness, and physical deformities. The law was used to encourage growth of the Aryan race through the sterilization of persons who fell under the quota of being genetically defective. 1% of citizens between the age of 17 to 24 had been sterilized within two years of the law passing.

Within four years, 300,000 patients had been sterilized. From about March 1941 to about January 1945, sterilization experiments were conducted at Auschwitz, Ravensbrück, and other places by Carl Clauberg. The purpose of these experiments was to develop a method of sterilization which would be suitable for sterilizing millions of people with a minimum of time and effort. The targets for sterilization included Jewish and Roma populations. These experiments were conducted by means of X-ray, surgery and various drugs. Thousands of victims were sterilized. Aside from its experimentation, the Nazi government sterilized around 400,000 people as part of its compulsory sterilization program.

Carl Clauberg was the leading research developer in the search for cost effective and efficient means of mass sterilization. He was particularly interested in experimenting on women from age twenty to forty who had already given birth. Prior to any experiments, Clauberg X-rayed women to make sure that there was no obstruction to their ovaries. Next, over the course of three to five sessions, he injected the women's cervixes with the goal of blocking their fallopian tubes. The women who stood against him and his experiments or were deemed as unfit test subjects were sent to be killed in the gas chambers.

Intravenous injections of solutions speculated to contain iodine and silver nitrate were successful, but had unwanted side effects such as vaginal bleeding, severe abdominal pain, and cervical cancer. Therefore, radiation treatment became the favored choice of sterilization. Specific amounts of exposure to radiation destroyed a person's ability to produce ova or sperm, sometimes administered through deception. Many suffered severe radiation burns.

The Nazis also implemented X-ray radiation treatment in their search for mass sterilization. They gave the women abdomen X-rays, men received them on their genitalia, for abnormal periods of time in attempt to invoke infertility. After the experiment was complete, they surgically removed their reproductive organs, often without anesthesia, for lab analysis.

M.D. William E. Seidelman, a professor from the University of Toronto, in collaboration with Dr. Howard Israel of Columbia University, published a report on an investigation on the medical experimentation performed in Austria under the Nazi regime. In that report he mentions a Doctor Hermann Stieve, who used the war to experiment on live humans. Stieve specifically focused on the reproductive system of women. He would tell women their date of death in advance, and he would evaluate how their psychological distress would affect their menstruation cycles. After they were murdered, he would dissect and examine their reproductive organs. Some of the women were raped after they were told the date when they would be killed so that Stieve could study the path of sperm through their reproductive system.

Experiments with poison
Somewhere between December 1943 and October 1944, experiments were conducted at Buchenwald to investigate the effect of various poisons. The poisons were secretly administered to experimental subjects in their food. The victims died as a result of the poison or were killed immediately in order to permit autopsies. In September 1944, experimental subjects were shot with poisonous bullets, suffered torture, and often died.

Some male Jewish prisoners had poisonous substances scrubbed or injected into their skin, causing boils filled with black fluid to form. These experiments were heavily documented as well as photographed by the Nazis.

Incendiary bomb experiments
From around November 1943 to around January 1944, experiments were conducted at Buchenwald to test the effect of various pharmaceutical preparations on phosphorus burns. These burns were inflicted on prisoners using phosphorus material extracted from incendiary bombs.

High altitude experiments

In early 1942, prisoners at Dachau concentration camp were used by Sigmund Rascher in experiments to aid German pilots who had to eject at high altitudes. It was rumored that Rascher performed vivisections on the brains of victims who survived the initial experiment. Of the 200 subjects, 80 died outright, and the others were murdered. In a letter from 5 April 1942 between Rascher and Heinrich Himmler, Rascher explains the results of a low-pressure experiment that was performed on people at Dachau Concentration camp in which the victim was suffocated while Rascher and another unnamed doctor took note of his reactions. The person was described as 37 years old and in good health before being murdered. Rascher described the victim's actions as he began to lose oxygen and timed the changes in behavior. The 37-year-old began to wiggle his head at four minutes; a minute later Rascher observed that he was suffering from cramps before falling unconscious. He describes how the victim then lay unconscious, breathing only three times per minute, until he stopped breathing 30 minutes after being deprived of oxygen. The victim then turned blue and began foaming at the mouth. An autopsy followed an hour later.

In a letter from Himmler to Rascher on 13 April 1942, Himmler ordered Rascher to continue the high altitude experiments and to continue experimenting on prisoners condemned to death and to "determine whether these men could be recalled to life". If a victim could be successfully resuscitated, Himmler ordered that he be pardoned to "concentration camp for life".

Blood coagulation experiments 
Sigmund Rascher experimented with the effects of Polygal, a substance made from beet and apple pectin, which aided blood clotting. He predicted that the preventive use of Polygal tablets would reduce bleeding from gunshot wounds sustained during combat or surgery. Subjects were given a Polygal tablet, shot through the neck or chest, or had their limbs amputated without anesthesia. Rascher published an article on his experience of using Polygal, without detailing the nature of the human trials, and set up a company staffed by prisoners to manufacture the substance.

Bruno Weber was the head of the Hygienic Institution at Block 10 in Auschwitz and injected his subjects with blood types that were differed from their own. This caused the blood cells to congeal, and the blood was studied. When the Nazis removed blood from someone, they often entered a major artery, causing the subject to die of major blood loss.

Electroshock experiments 
Some female prisoners of Block 10 were also subject to electroshock therapy. These women were often sick and underwent this experimentation before being sent to the gas chambers and killed.

Aftermath

Other documented transcriptions from Heinrich Himmler include phrases such as "These researches… can be performed by us with particular efficiency because I personally assumed the responsibility for supplying asocial individuals and criminals who deserve only to die from concentration camps for these experiments." Many of the subjects died as a result of the experiments conducted by the Nazis, while many others were murdered after the tests were completed to study the effects post mortem. Those who survived were often left mutilated, with permanent disability, weakened bodies, and mental distress. On 19 August 1947, the doctors captured by Allied forces were put on trial in USA vs. Karl Brandt et al., commonly known as the Doctors' Trial. At the trial, several of the doctors argued in their defense that there was no international law regarding medical experimentation. Some doctors also claimed that they had been doing the world a favor. An SS doctor was quoted saying that "Jews were the festering appendix in the body of Europe." He then went on to argue he was doing the world a favor by eliminating them.

The issue of informed consent had previously been controversial in German medicine in 1900, when Albert Neisser infected patients (mainly prostitutes) with syphilis without their consent. Despite Neisser's support from most of the academic community, public opinion, led by psychiatrist Albert Moll, was against Neisser. While Neisser went on to be fined by the Royal Disciplinary Court, Moll developed "a legally based, positivistic contract theory of the patient-doctor relationship" that was not adopted into German law. Eventually, the minister for religious, educational, and medical affairs issued a directive stating that medical interventions other than for diagnosis, healing, and immunization were excluded under all circumstances if "the human subject was a minor or not competent for other reasons", or if the subject had not given his or her "unambiguous consent" after a "proper explanation of the possible negative consequences" of the intervention, though this was not legally binding.

In response, Drs. Leo Alexander and Andrew Conway Ivy, the American Medical Association representatives at the Doctors' Trial, drafted a ten-point memorandum entitled Permissible Medical Experiment that went on to be known as the Nuremberg Code. The code calls for such standards as voluntary consent of patients, avoidance of unnecessary pain and suffering, and that there must be a belief that the experimentation will not end in death or disability.<ref>{{cite web|title=Regulations and Ethical Guidelines: Reprinted from Trials of War Criminals before the Nuremberg Military Tribunals under Control Council Law No. 10, Vol. 2, pp. 181–182 |publisher=Washington, D.C.: U.S. Government Printing Office |year=1949 |work=Office of Human Subjects Research |url=http://ohsr.od.nih.gov/guidelines/nuremberg.html |access-date=23 March 2008 |url-status=dead |archive-url=https://web.archive.org/web/20071029120713/http://ohsr.od.nih.gov/guidelines/nuremberg.html |archive-date=29 October 2007 }}</ref> The Code was not cited in any of the findings against the defendants and never made it into either German or American medical law. This code comes from the Nuremberg Trials where the most heinous of Nazi leaders were put on trial for their war crimes. To this day, the Nuremberg Code remains a major stepping stone for medical experimentation.

Modern ethical issues
Andrew Conway Ivy stated the Nazi experiments were of no medical value. Data obtained from the experiments, however, has been used and considered for use in multiple fields, often causing controversy. Some object to the data's use purely on ethical grounds, disagreeing with the methods used to obtain it, while others have rejected the research only on scientific grounds, criticizing methodological inconsistencies. Those in favor of using the data argue that if it has practical value to save lives, it would be equally unethical not to use it. Arnold S. Relman, editor of The New England Journal of Medicine from 1977 until 1991, refused to allow the journal to publish any article that cited the Nazi experiments.

The results of the Dachau freezing experiments have been used in some late 20th century research into the treatment of hypothermia; at least 45 publications had referenced the experiments as of 1984, though the majority of publications in the field did not cite the research. Those who have argued in favor of using the research include Robert Pozos from the University of Minnesota and John Hayward from the University of Victoria. In a 1990 review of the Dachau experiments, Robert Berger concludes that the study has "all the ingredients of a scientific fraud" and that the data "cannot advance science or save human lives."

In 1989, the United States Environmental Protection Agency (EPA) considered using data from Nazi research into the effects of phosgene gas, believing the data could help US soldiers stationed in the Persian Gulf at the time. They eventually decided against using it, on the grounds it would lead to criticism and similar data could be obtained from later studies on animals. Writing for Jewish Law, Baruch Cohen concluded that the EPA's "knee-jerk reaction" to reject the data's use was "typical, but unprofessional", arguing that it could have saved lives.

See also
 Bullenhuser Damm
 Erwin Ding-Schuler
 Epidemic Prevention and Water Purification Department
 Guatemala syphilis experiment
 Herta Oberheuser
 Henry K. Beecher
 Human experimentation in North Korea
 Human radiation experiments
 Japanese human experimentation
 Jewish skull collection
 Karl Genzken
 Karl Gebhardt
 Viktor Frankl
 List of medical eponyms with Nazi associations
 List of Nazi doctors
 Nazi eugenics
 Project MKUltra (CIA)
 Shiro Ishii
 Unethical human experimentation in the United States
Margarethe Kraus

References

Further reading
 
 Baumslag, N. (2005). Murderous Medicine: Nazi Doctors, Human Experimentation, and Typhus. Praeger Publishers.  
 Michalczyk, J. (Dir.) (1997). In The Shadow of the Reich: Nazi Medicine. First Run Features. (video)
 
 Rees, L. (2005). Auschwitz: A New History. Public Affairs. 
 Weindling, P.J. (2005). Nazi Medicine and the Nuremberg Trials: From Medical War Crimes to Informed Consent. Palgrave Macmillan. 
 

External links
The Infamous Medical Experiments from Holocaust Survivors and Remembrance Project: "Forget You Not"
 United States Holocaust Memorial Museum – Online Exhibition: Doctors Trial
 United States Holocaust Memorial Museum – Online Exhibition:  Deadly Medicine: Creating the Master Race
 United States Holocaust Memorial Museum – Library Bibliography: Medical Experiments
Jewish Virtual Library: Medical Experiments Table of Contents

Controversy regarding use of findings
Campell, Robert. "Citations of shame; scientists are still trading on Nazi atrocities", New Scientist'', 28 February 1985, 105(1445), p. 31.Citations of shame; scientists are still trading on Nazi atrocities
"Citing Nazi 'Research': To Do So Without Condemnation Is Not Defensible"
"On the Ethics of Citing Nazi Research"
"Remembering the Holocaust, Part 2"
"The Ethics Of Using Medical Data From Nazi Experiments"

 
Political repression in Nazi Germany
Nazi war crimes
Medical experimentation on prisoners

sv:Förintelsen#Medicinska experiment